Tendaho Dam is an earth-filled dam in the eastern Afar Region of Ethiopia. It is situated on the Awash River, and its reservoir also receives the output of the Mille River. The dam is a project of the Ethiopian Water Works Construction Enterprise (EWWCE).  Project planning began in 2005, with construction occurring from 2010 to 2014. Its purpose is to provide irrigation primarily for the Tendaho Sugar Factory sugar cane plantation., as well as drinking water for the region. Out of the 60,000 hectares of land planned to be irrigated, 10,000 would be allotted for social services and the community, while the remaining 50,000 hectares is for cultivating sugar cane for the sugar factory.

The nearest towns are Logiya, situated just north of the dam, and Semera, which has an airstrip (Semera Airport) and a university.

References

Dams in Ethiopia
Afar Region
Dams completed in 2014
Earth-filled dams
2014 establishments in Ethiopia
21st-century architecture in Ethiopia